Indirect parliamentary elections were held in Rwanda in 1957.

Electoral system
The Decree of 14 July 1952 by the Belgian authorities introduced an element of democracy to the Rwandan political system. A complicated electoral system was created, which involved seven stages of elections to eventually elect the National Superior Council. The system was modified from the 1953–54 elections with all men aged 18 or over able to vote for the Sub-Chiefdom Councils, as voting had previously been restricted to notables.

Results
The elections in the sub-chiefdoms were held in 1956, with elections to the Chiefdom Councils Territorial Councils and the Superior Council following in 1957.

References

1957 elections in Africa
1957 in Rwanda
1957